Philip Wodehouse may refer to:

Sir Philip Wodehouse, 1st Baronet (?–1623), English baronet, soldier and Member of Parliament
Sir Philip Wodehouse, 3rd Baronet (1608–1681), English baronet and Member of Parliament
Philip Wodehouse (Royal Navy officer) (1773–1838), British Royal Navy vice-admiral
Sir Philip Edmond Wodehouse (1811–1887), British colonial administrator